Statistics of the Primera División de México for the 1982–83 season.

Overview
It was contested by 20 teams, and Puebla won the championship.

C.F. Oaxtepec was promoted from Segunda División.

Zacatepec was relegated to Segunda División.

Teams

Moves
 The owner of Atlético Español decided to sell the team to the Mexican league. This gave way for Necaxa to come back to play.
 Tampico was relegated to Segunda División, however, the oil workers union bought the Atletas Campesinos franchise, they moved the team to Tampico and was renamed as Tampico Madero.

Group stage

Group 1

Group 2

Group 3

Group 4

Results

Relegation playoff

Atlético Morelia won 5-4 on aggregate. Zacatepec was relegated to Segunda División

Playoff

Puebla won the championship.

Quarterfinal

América won 6-0 on aggregate.

Guadalajara won 1-6 on aggregate.

Puebla won 6-3 on aggregate.

UdeG won 2-4 on aggregate.

Semi-finals

Puebla won 4-3 on aggregate.

Guadalajara 2-4 on aggregate.

Final

Aggregate tied. Puebla won 7–6 on penalty shootout.

References 

Mexico - List of final tables (RSSSF)

Liga MX seasons
Mex
1982–83 in Mexican football